{{DISPLAYTITLE:Fischer group Fi23}}   

In the area of modern algebra known as group theory, the Fischer group Fi23 is a sporadic simple group of order
   21831352711131723
 = 4089470473293004800
 ≈ 4.

History
Fi23 is one of the 26 sporadic groups and is one of the three Fischer groups introduced by  while investigating 3-transposition groups.

The Schur multiplier and the outer automorphism group are both trivial.

Representations

The Fischer group Fi23 has a rank 3 action  on  a graph of 31671 vertices corresponding to 3-transpositions, with point stabilizer the double cover of the Fischer group Fi22. It has a second rank-3 action on 137632 points

The smallest faithful complex representation has dimension . The group has an irreducible representation of dimension 253 over the field with 3 elements.

Generalized Monstrous Moonshine

Conway and Norton suggested in their 1979 paper that monstrous moonshine is not limited to the monster, but that similar phenomena may be found for other groups. Larissa Queen and others subsequently found that one can construct the expansions of many Hauptmoduln from simple combinations of dimensions of sporadic groups. For Fi23, the relevant McKay-Thompson series is  where one can set the constant term a(0) = 42,

and η(τ) is the Dedekind eta function.

Maximal subgroups 
 found the 14 conjugacy classes of maximal subgroups of Fi23 as follows:

 2.Fi22
 O8+(3):S3
 22.U6(2).2
 S8(2)
 O7(3) × S3
 211.M23
 31+8.21+6.31+2.2S4
 [310].(L3(3) × 2)
 S12
 (22 × 21+8).(3 × U4(2)).2
 26+8:(A7 × S3)
 S6(2) × S4
 S4(4):4
 L2(23)

References 

 contains a complete proof of Fischer's theorem.
 This is the first part of Fischer's preprint on the construction of his groups. The remainder of the paper is unpublished (as of 2010).

 
Wilson, R. A.  ATLAS of Finite Group Representations.

External links 
 MathWorld: Fischer Groups
 Atlas of Finite Group Representations: Fi23

Sporadic groups